Boomplaas Cave is located in the Cango Valley in the foothills of the Swartberg mountain range, north of Oudtshoorn, Eden District Municipality in the Western Cape Province, South Africa. The site's documentation contributed to the reconstruction of palaeo-environments in the context of changes in climate within periods of the Late Pleistocene (11,700 - 129,000 years BP) and the Holocene (since 12,000 years BP). The cave has served multiple functions during its occupation, such as a kraal (enclosure) for animals, a place for the storage of oil rich fruits and as a hunting camp. Circular stone hearths and calcified dung remains of domesticated sheep as well as stone adzes and pottery art (painted stones) were excavated indicating that humans lived at the site and kept animals.

Excavation
The excavation conducted by H.J. Deacon from 1974 to 1979 was part of an archaeological and palaeo-ecological study (including the Klasies River Caves) to provide information on changes in vegetation and fauna, the cultural sequence and the function of the cave in the area. Together the sequences of the Boomplaas Cave and the Klasies River have established a unique record of the last 125,000 years for the region and southern Africa.

Faunal remains are preserved in all layer that include bone accumulated through human occupation and the bones of rodents, accumulated by owls roosting in the cave when humans were absent. Comparative faunal samples were collected from carnivore lairs (hyena and leopard) in the valley and from other owl roosts and a vegetation survey of the surroundings was undertaken. Records provided a base for the interpretation of charcoal and plant remains and to assess the effects of climate fluctuations on vegetation and animal life.

Analysis of the artifacts in the Upper Pleistocene sequence suggest that the boundary between the Middle and Later Stone Age traditions is placed here between 30,000 and 40,000 years BP. and that while the Middle Stone Age populations may have been anatomically modern, their behaviour patterns do not show comparable continuity with the ethnographic present.

Deposits
The stratigraphy of the deposits is very distinct and clearly visible and is documented in terms of sets of broadly contemporary layers (members), individual layers (units) and parts of layers (sub-units). The members recognised in the Boomplaas sequence are described as follows, from the top to the bottom.
 CBM Member - late 18th century and early 19th century
 DGL Member - around 1,700 years ago
 BLD Member - 2,000 years ago
 BLA Member - 6,500 years ago
 BRL Member - 10,000 years ago
 CL Member - between 14,500 and 12,000 years ago.
 GWA/HCA Member - 17,500 years ago
 LP Member - around the Last Glacial Maximum
 LPC Member - almost 22,000 years ago
 YOL Member - between 22,000 and about 32,000 years ago
 BP Member - 32,000 years ago
 OLP Member - 42,000 years ago
 BOL Member - suggested age 65,000 years
 OCH Member - 80,000 years
 LOH Member - bedrock layer

Notable artifacts
 The oldest artifacts (BOL) are triangular stone flakes with facetted platforms.
 The stone artifact assemblage of the BOL Member and of the BP Member are made primarily of quartzite and include long flake blades (longer than 100 mm ) with lateral retouch on the main flake surface.
 At the YOL Member most objects are typical Middle Stone Age artifacts.
 The artifacts associated with the CL Member are classified within the Robberg industry (LSA) (bladelet industry of southern Africa), characterized by numbers of small blades (bladelets) and the small conical cores that produced them.
 The artifacts from BLA is assigned to the Wilton industry (Late Stone Age culture in southern Africa) with a higher frequency of backed tools than in BLD and DGL, associated with small scrapers and adzes.
 Several mammal species disappear during the Pleistocene/Holocene transition and a shift from hunting larger bodied animals like zebra and wildebeest to hunting or trapping smaller grysbok-sized antelope occurs.
 Ancestral Khoekhoen settlers account for leftovers of stone tools, ornamented pottery and seed storage pits in the most recent layers. (BLD, DGL).

See also
 Blombos Cave
 Klasies River Caves

References

External links
 Human Timeline (Interactive) – Smithsonian, National Museum of Natural History (August 2016).

Archaeological sites in South Africa
Caves of South Africa
Limestone caves
Paleoanthropological sites
Archaeological sites of Southern Africa
Stone Age Africa